Marc Marie, Marquis de Bombelles (1744–1822) was a French diplomat and ecclesiastic. He was a son of Henri François de Bombelles, tutor and guardian of the duke of Orleans.

Biography
He was born at Bitsch in Lorraine, and served in the army through the Seven Years' War. In 1765 he entered the diplomatic service, and after several diplomatic missions became ambassador of France to Portugal in 1786, being charged to win over that country to the Family Compact, but the madness of the queen and then the death of the king prevented his success.

In 1778, he married Angelique Charlotte de Mackau known as Marie-Angélique de Bombelles (1762–1800), the confidante of Madame Elisabeth. The couple had several children, including the diplomat Louis Philippe de Bombelles, and count Charles-René de Bombelles the second husband of Marie-Louise of Austria.

He was transferred to Vienna early in 1789, but the French Revolution cut short his diplomatic career, and he was deprived of his post in September 1790. He remained attached to Louis XVI, and was employed on secret missions to other sovereigns, to gain their aid for Louis. In 1792 he emigrated, and after the Battle of Valmy lived in retirement in Switzerland.

In 1804, after the death of his wife, he withdrew to the monastery of Brünn in Austria, and became a priest, vicar of Oberglogau near Neustadt, Prussian Silesia. In 1815 he returned to France, and became bishop of Amiens (1819). He died in Paris.

His son was the diplomat Louis Philippe de Bombelles.

Notes

1744 births
1822 deaths
18th-century French diplomats
Bishops of Amiens
French marquesses
De Bombelles family